Armour is an extinct town in Pawnee County, in the U.S. state of Nebraska.

A post office was established at Armour in 1890, and remained in operation until 1934. The community may be named after the Armour and Company.

References

Ghost towns in Nebraska
Geography of Pawnee County, Nebraska